Turning Me On may refer to:

Music
"Turning Me On", song by Andy Moor (musician) from album Zero Point One 2012
"Turning Me On", single 2004 by Shifty Shellshock Happy Love Sick 2002
"Turning Me On", song by Frankie DeCarlos (album)
"Turning Me On", hit song by Tommy Page
"Turning Me On", song by Da'Ville from album Ichiban

See also
Turnin' Me On (disambiguation)